Between Us is the first greatest hits album by British girl group Little Mix, released through RCA Records on 12 November 2021. Announced on the tenth-year anniversary of the group's formation on The X Factor UK, it was described as a celebration of sisterhood and friendship, with the recording stages for the new songs taking place between the COVID-19 pandemic and group members Leigh-Anne Pinnock and Perrie Edwards' pregnancies. It was supported by the release of two singles; "Love (Sweet Love)" and "No", which both reached the top-40 on the UK Singles Chart.  

Between Us contains 18 of the group's singles, including four of their UK number ones on the standard edition; "Wings", "Black Magic", "Shout Out to My Ex" and "Sweet Melody". It also contains four new songs, with an additional fifth one being included on additional versions of the album. Commercially, the album debuted at number four on the UK Albums Chart, becoming Little Mix's seventh consecutive album to reach the top-five on the chart. It was the twelfth biggest selling cassette of 2021 in the UK and was listed as one of Sony Music's top ten best-selling albums of 2021. After The Confetti Tour, in 2022, it reached a new peak of number three. The album also reached the top ten in Ireland, Portugal Spain, the Netherlands, and Australia.  

To promote the album, "Love (Sweet Love)" and "No" were performed on The Confetti Tour, while a televised performance of its title track was aired on The Graham Norton Show.

Background
Little Mix teased the project on 16 August 2021, three days before the official announcement, via their social media accounts by posting a video displaying all of their former logos, with a new one being shown at the end along with a snippet of one of the new songs, what would become the title track. On 18 August, the group shared a teaser on Twitter and Instagram using the hashtag #10YearsOfLittleMix. On 19 August, the day of their ten-year anniversary, the group then announced that they would be releasing a new album titled Between Us.

The track listing was announced a few hours later. The standard edition includes 22 tracks, featuring 18 of the group's previous singles and four new songs. A fifth new track was confirmed to be included on the deluxe editions of the album only. Little Mix described the album as "a celebration of 10 years of hits, friendship, new tracks, and so much more". They also dedicated the album to their fans and thanked them for their support over the last ten years:

Between Us became available for pre-order the same day as it was announced. The album was made available in a variety of physical formats, including on CD, cassette, as a box set, and on picture disc vinyl with editions featuring each individual member in front of a floral backdrop. This also marked the group's first  greatest hits album.

Group members Perrie Edwards, Jade Thirlwall, and Leigh-Anne Pinnock went on to share their thoughts on the album. "We can't believe it has been 10 years. Time has flown, and when you look back we have done so much that we're super proud of", Edwards said in an interview. "It's going to be great to have all our big hits as a band on one album for the first time, celebrating 10 massive years of Little Mix. The tracks also show how much we have grown as artists, from 'Wings' to 'Heartbreak Anthem'", added Thirlwall. Pinnock also went on to say, "We're also really excited to release five brand new Little Mix songs that we've been creating. We can't wait for our fans to hear the new tracks we've been working on. We hope they love them as much as we do!"

For the Japanese version of the album, Sony Music Japan allowed fans to vote on a song to be included on the album. "Happiness" won the poll, and the Japanese version of "Wings" was also included. Various editions of the album feature different shots from the photo shoot of the album, whilst the digital download, the Mixers and Experience editions all use the same cover as the deluxe edition but with different colours.

On 15 November 2021, Little Mix released the Mixers Edition of Between Us on Spotify, after asking fans in October to choose the order of the existing album tracks and 10 new songs to include.

Singles

Between Us, was supported by two single releases and features five new tracks in total. On 30 August 2021, the group announced that "Love (Sweet Love)" would serve as the lead single. Described as a pop song with lyrics that discusses independence, female empowerment, and self-love. It was written by Jade Thirlwall, Leigh-Anne Pinnock, MNEK, Lauren Aquilina and Sakima. It was received positive reviews from critics with Lyndsey Havens from Billboard describing the new song as the "punchy, soulful pop stompers that fans have come to crave from Little Mix". The song peaked at number 33 on the UK Singles Chart, becoming the group's 31st top 40 single there.

On 12 November 2021, "No" was released as the next single alongside the album. It was the first song the group wrote together as a trio after the departure of former group member Nelson. Described as a dance-pop track, it reached number thirty-five on the UK Singles Chart

The album also featured two other songs "Trash" and "Cut You Off", which peaked at number fifty-nine in the United Kingdom and number fifty-four in Ireland.

Promotional singles 
On 5 November 2021, "Between Us" was released as the album's promotional single, one week before the release of the Between Us album. The song was co-written by Jade Thirlwall, Perrie Edwards, Leigh-Anne Pinnock with MNEK, Tre Jean-Marie, and Janee ‘Jin Jin’ Bennett. Little Mix described the track as a tribute to their friendship, with lyrics that references to some of the group’s previous released singles.

The music video was released on 2 December 2021 alongside a message from the group announcing their hiatus after the Confetti Tour in 2022. The song received its debut performance the following day on 3 December 2021 on The Graham Norton Show.

Commercial performance
Before the album dropped, it was reported by Official Charts Company that at the midweek stage, Little Mix and Taylor Swift were contenders for the number-one spot. It was branded by some to be one of the closest chart battles to happen so far in the UK that year with a nine sale difference between the albums. On the UK Albums Chart, the album debuted at number four, selling 33,822 copies in its first week, becoming the group's seventh top-five album there.  Between Us, was named as the twelfth biggest-selling cassette of 2021. On April 29, 2022 the album reached a new peak of number three after 24 weeks on the charts. On 13 May 2022, the album spent a 26th consecutive week inside the top twenty of the UK Albums Charts. The album has surpassed over 109,000 streams in the UK. On 11 November, 2022 it became Little Mix first album since Glory Days (2017), to spend a full year on the UK Official Albums; becoming the fourteenth album by a girl group to achieve this.

Outside of the United Kingdom, the album debuted at number two on the Irish Albums Chart, becoming the group's seventh consecutive top ten album in Ireland. It missed out on the number one album spot to Taylor Swift's Red (Taylor’s Version). On April 15, after The Confetti Tour, Between Us re-entered the official top ten albums charts at number three, spending 14 weeks inside the top ten of the charts there.

Between Us, reached number three in Portugal and Scotland and reached the top ten in Australia, Spain, and the Netherlands. It also reached the top twenty in Belgium and New Zealand, the top thirty in Germany, and the top forty in Austria, Italy and Poland. It also charted in other countries such as Japan, Canada and in the United States.

By the end of 2021, Little Mix was named as one of three UK acts to be feature on the top-ten best selling albums from Sony Music. In July 2022, the album was named as the fifth biggest selling album so far in the UK, selling over 119,000 copies and becoming the biggest selling album there by a group. It has since been certified Platinum in Australia and Switzerland, and Gold in the United Kingdom and Mexico.

Year-end lists

Track listing

Standard editions

Deluxe editions

Charts

Weekly charts

Year-end charts

Certifications

References

2021 greatest hits albums
Little Mix albums
RCA Records compilation albums
Albums produced by David Guetta
Albums produced by Electric (music producers)
Albums produced by Camille Purcell
Albums produced by Louis Bell
Albums produced by MNEK
Albums produced by Richard Stannard (songwriter)
Albums produced by Stargate
Albums produced by Steve James (DJ)
Albums produced by Steve Mac
Albums produced by Tayla Parx
Albums produced by TMS (production team)
Albums produced by Tre Jean-Marie